Chithiram Pesuthadi is an Indian Tamil-language television drama that airs on Zee Tamil and streams on ZEE5. It premiered on 19 April 2021 and ended on 12 November 2022. The series stars Deepika Rangaraju in the lead with Shiv Sathish and Baboos Baburaj. It is about a social drama, which deals with issues like gender bias and female infanticide.

Synopsis
Gomathi had three daughters Malar, Kayal and Thangamayil. Her husband Gurumoorthy, a corrupt police officer left them, has they had three daughter and he desires a son. Thangamayil who aims to become an IPS officer to make her father Gurumoorthy to appreciate her. Jeeva, a rich background man falls in love with Thangamayil and they both married with the support of Jeeva's family and they hid the marriage from Thangamayil's family. Gurumoorthy slowly become a good man and feels for his mistakes and he loved his daughter Thangamayil. But Gomathi refuses Gurumoorthy. 

The story mainly focus on how Thangamayil will become a IPS officer and how will she unite their parents.

Cast

Main
 Deepika Rangaraju as Thangamayil
 A village girl, who aims to become an IPS officer. She is Gurumoorthy and Gomathi's last daughter, Malar and Kayal's younger sister, Jeeva's love interest and wife, now she was a police constable. (2021–2022) 
 Shiv Sathish as Jeeva
 A rich man, who takes the life very easier, He is Rajashekar and Bhavani's second son, Thangamayil's husband. (2021–2022) 
 Baboos Baburaj as Gurumoorthy (Sundaram)
 A Police Inspector, who wish to want a boy child but his fate, he had three girl children Malar, Kayal and Thangamayil. So he leaved his wife Gomathi alone with the daughters. (2021–2022)

Recurring
 Jayashree / Caroline Hiltrud as Gomathi (Susila)
 Malar, Kayal and Thangamayil's mother; Gurumoorthy's first wife (2021–2022) 
 Sherin Janu / Navya Narayanan as Malar
 Kayal and Thangamayil's elder sister; Gurumoorthy and Gomathi's first daughter; Gopi's wife (2021–2022) 
 Abinavya / Hema Dayal as Kayal
 Malar and Thangamayil's sister; Gurumoorthy and Gomathi's second daughter. (2021–2022) 
 Madhan as Vetri
 Gurumoorthy's and Kasturi's son (2021–2022) 
 Kiranmai Kannan as Manimegalai
 A police constable and Thangamayil's friend (2022)
 Iyappan as Gopi
 Gayathri and Madhuvanthi's elder brother;  Malar's husband (2021–2022) 
 Pooja Ramky as Thenu
 Thangamayil's friend (2021–2022) 
 Visalakshi Manikandan /  Kavyavarshini as Kasturi
 Gurumoorthy's second wife (2021–2022) 
 Feroz Khan as Kasi 
 Kasturi's brother (2022)
 Nathan Shyam as Ram
 A Sub-inspector of police (2022) 
 Ashok Pandian as Rajashekar
 Karthik, Jeeva and Isai's father; Bhavani's husband (2021–2022) 
 Dharani as Bhavani
 Karthik, Jeeva and Isai's mother; Rajashekar's wife (2021–2022) 
 Suveta as Madhuvanthi
 Natrayan and Malliga's daughter; Gopi and Gayathri's younger sister (2021–2022) 
 V. Dasarathy as Natrayan
 Gopi, Gayathri and Madhuvanthi's father; Malliga's husband (2021–2022) 
 Sheela / Aishwarya as Malliga
 Gopi, Gayathri and Madhuvanthi's mother; Natrayan's wife (2021–2022) 
 Swetha Subramanian as Gayathri
 Gopi and Madhuvanthi's sister;  Karthik's wife; Rajashekar and Bhavani's daughter-in-law (2021–2022) 
 Anil Neredimilli as Karthik
 Rajashekar and Bhavani's elder son; Jeeva and Isai's elder brother; Gayathri's husband (2021–2022) 
 Sailalitha as Isai
 Rajashekar and Bhavani's daughter; Karthik and Jeeva's younger sister (2021–2022)
 VJ Deepika Lakshmanapandian as Mahalakshmi
 A thief (2022)

References

External links
 
 Chithiram Pesuthadi at ZEE5

Zee Tamil original programming
Tamil-language police television series
2021 Tamil-language television series debuts
Tamil-language romance television series
Tamil-language television shows
Television shows set in Tamil Nadu
2022 Tamil-language television series endings
Tamil-language melodrama television series